Issues is an American metalcore band based in Atlanta, Georgia, founded in 2012. The band currently consists of guitarist and vocalist AJ Rebollo, bassist and vocalist Skyler Acord, and drummer Josh Manuel. They are known for their combination of metalcore, nu metal, pop and contemporary R&B.

Following original member Michael Bohn and Tyler Carter's departure from Woe, Is Me, the duo formed Issues with keyboardist Ben Ferris, bassist Cory Ferris, guitarist AJ Rebollo, and drummer Case Snedecor, subsequently signing to Rise Records. The Ferris brothers departed from the group prior to the release of the Black Diamonds EP, in 2012. Snedecor left the band in 2013 and was replaced by drummer Josh Manuel while Ben and Cory Ferris were replaced by keyboardist and disc jockey Tyler Acord and bassist Skyler Acord, respectively. The band released their self-titled debut studio album in 2014, which was praised for its DJ-based breakdowns and mixture of metalcore and electronica, charting at number-nine on the US Billboard 200. They released their remix album, Diamond Dreams, in November 2014. Their sophomore studio album, Headspace, was released in May 2016. On January 4, 2018, it was revealed the band had fired Michael Bohn due to "wanting to go in a different direction". The following year, the group released their third studio album, Beautiful Oblivion, on October 4, 2019. In September 2020, Tyler Carter was fired from the band for multiple accusations of grooming and sexual misconduct.

Issues has won two accolades, including the Alternative Press Music Award for Artist of the Year in 2015 and for Best Bassist the following year, and altogether has been nominated for seven Alternative Press Music Awards. The group was nominated for Best New Talent at the 2014 Revolver Golden Gods. The band has performed at various music festivals including the Vans Warped Tour, the Reading and Leeds Festivals, and Slam Dunk Festival.

History

2012: Formation and Black Diamonds

The project was first announced by former Woe, Is Me vocalist  Tyler Carter in 2012, stating that he had plans to create a band with other former members of the band. This included; Michael Bohn, Cory Ferris and Ben Ferris. Before the band started to record their debut EP, titled Black Diamonds, both Cory and Ben Ferris were unable to attend the recording sessions and ultimately left the band. Ben Ferris departed from the band early in September 2012, while Cory Ferris decided to stay with the band until he announced his departure in November 2012. Skyler Acord played bass guitar on the band's debut EP, while his brother Tyler Acord played keyboards and turntables. Both of the Acord brothers were later asked to join the band after the departure of bassist Jake Vintson in early 2013.

The band first started touring as a support act with Attila on their "Party with the Devil Tour", along with support acts Make Me Famous, Ice Nine Kills and Adestria. Their debut EP, Black Diamonds, was released on November 13, 2012. The lead single for Black Diamonds, titled "King of Amarillo", was released on October 2, 2012, along with a lyric video. The band was featured on the Punk Goes Pop 5 compilation album covering "Boyfriend", originally by Justin Bieber.

2013–2015: Self-titled album and Diamond Dreams EP

Issues' first release of 2013 was a stand-alone single titled "Hooligans", which was released on July 5 and was accompanied with a music video. In May, drummer Case Snedecor left the band due to musical differences. But in the next month, his successor, Josh Manuel, was announced as the new drummer of the band, making this the fourth lineup change in the band's short history. On May 19, 2013, the band participated in the Vans Warped Tour.

The band confirmed that they would be releasing an EP full of acoustic versions of songs from their debut EP 'Black Diamonds', which was later released on, November 18, 2014. The band was initially set to release their debut album in November, however it was pushed back to January 2014. It was revealed in December that the album was set to be released on February 18, 2014, along with the album details and track list, revealing it to be a self-titled album.

Issues made another release through Fearless Records on the "Punk Goes Christmas" album, released on November 2, with song "Merry Christmas, Happy Holidays". It was later announced that they would be joining Beartooth on Of Mice & Men UK headlining tour in April as a support act. It was also announced that they will be joining Bring Me the Horizon and Of Mice & Men on their 'American Dream Tour' beginning February with fellow supporting acts Letlive and Northlane. The band also confirmed that they will be performing the entire Vans Warped Tour 2014.

The band's debut album Issues was released on February 18, 2014. In April, it was announced that the band would perform at 2014's Reading and Leeds Festival. The band were a support act for the Wembley Arena performance in London on December 5 supporting Bring Me the Horizon along with Young Guns and Sleepwave. The band will be headlining in America dubbed the "Journeys Noise: Thanks for the Invite" tour and will be supported by I Killed The Prom Queen, Ghost Town, Marmozets and Nightmares and takes place late October to mid December.

On October 17, 2014, the band confirmed they'd be releasing their first acoustic EP, Diamond Dreams, produced and mixed by the band themselves along with Matt Malpass and various other personnel. The EP was officially released on November 17.

2015–2018: Headspace and Bohn's departure

On January 2, 2015, Issues were featured in an article on Alternative Press, in which they stated that the writing and pre-production for their second album would begin on January 23. Ty Acord announced that he wouldn't be touring with Issues during 2015, in order to focus on his work as a music producer. However, he stated that he would still be a member of the band in the studio, and will co-produce the upcoming album, titled "Headspace"

Drummer Josh Manuel said that the band was in the studio writing for their second album and that they had booked time, once again, with Kristofer Crummett and Erik Ron in July 2015 to record it. In November 2015, they announced that they will be a five piece, with Ty leaving to focus on producing music and working with Issues only as a collaborator.

Issues were announced as part of the line-up for Slam Dunk Festival during November 2015.

Issues announced the release of their first single off the album "The Realest" to be on March 24, 2016. A few days later, the band released other 3 track from the upcoming album: "Coma", a heavier song called "Blue Wall" and a deep and emotional song called "Slow Me Down". The album was released on May 20.

On January 4, 2018, the band confirmed that they fired vocalist Michael Bohn.

Between recording sessions and the release of the band's upcoming third studio album, vocalist Tyler Carter released his debut solo studio album, Moonshine, on February 1, 2019, on Rise Records.

2019–2020: Beautiful Oblivion and Carter's firing
On April 9, 2019, Issues announced that they had completed recording sessions and tracking for their upcoming third studio album. In a statement from bass guitarist Skyler Acord, he stated: "We finished our album yesterday, almost two years to the day from the first writing session. It (literally) almost killed us in more ways than one but good art comes from conflict. I can't wait for you to hear what we went through, woven into the music we're all so proud of." On the same day, the band confirmed that they would release a new single "coming soon." Before the album's announcement or promotional tour, the group is set to tour as support on American metalcore band I Prevail's Trauma U.S. Tour, from April 24 to August 9, 2019. While taking online polls via Instagram on what the setlist should be for the upcoming tour, it was announced that the first single for the upcoming album would be released on May 3, 2019, titled "Tapping Out". On August 11, it was announced that the album would be titled Beautiful Oblivion and be released on October 4.

On September 1, 2020, the band announced that founding member and vocalist Tyler Carter had been kicked from the band due to accusations of grooming and sexual misconduct.  Following Carter's departure from the band, the three remaining members released an album of instrumental tracks from Beautiful Oblivion on November 20, 2020. Bassist and vocalist Skyler Acord began working with American musical duo Twenty One Pilots in 2021.

Musical style and influences
Issues has often been associated with metalcore, having a blend of nu metal, pop, electronic and R&B. AllMusic said the band mixed these genres to obtain "new nu metal", which has also been termed nu metalcore. The band themselves has commented that they wanted to mix metal and "Top 40" music in the same way that nu metal mixed heavy metal music with hip hop music. Other than being labelled as nu metal, Issues has also been labelled as metalcore, "pop/metal" and "R&Bcore". They are influenced by artists and groups such as Korn, Katy Perry, Linkin Park, Michael Jackson, Slipknot, Miley Cyrus, and Kesha.

Band members

Current members

 Adrian "AJ" Rebollo – guitars (2012–present), unclean vocals (2015–present)
 Skyler Acord – bass guitar (2013–present; session 2012), backing clean and unclean vocals (2018–present)
 Josh Manuel – drums (2013–present), backing unclean vocals <small>(2018–present) 

Former members
Tyler Carter – clean vocals, backing unclean vocals (2012–2020)
Ben Ferris – keyboards, synthesizers, unclean vocals (2012)
Cory Ferris – bass (2012)
Jake Vintson – bass (2012–2013)
Case Snedecor – drums (2012–2013)
Michael Bohn – unclean & clean vocals (2012–2018)

Session musicians
Tyler Acord – turntables, keyboards, synthesizers, keytar, samples, producer (2012, 2015–present, official 2012–2015)

Timeline

Discography

Studio albums

EPs

Singles

Music videos

Accolades

Alternative Press Music Awards

Revolver's Golden Gods

References

External links
 

Metalcore musical groups from Georgia (U.S. state)
American contemporary R&B musical groups
American pop music groups
American nu metal musical groups
Rise Records artists
Musical groups established in 2012
2012 establishments in Georgia (U.S. state)
Musical groups from Atlanta
Rock music groups from Georgia (U.S. state)